Front Line is a 1981 Australian documentary film directed by David Bradbury. It follows the career of Tasmanian-born combat cameraman Neil Davis, particularly his time in South Vietnam and Cambodia in the late 1960s and early 1970s. It was nominated for an Academy Award for Best Documentary Feature.

References

External links

Front Line at Frontline Films

1981 films
Films directed by David Bradbury
Australian documentary films
1981 documentary films
1980s English-language films